Cecilio Andrés Domínguez Ruiz (born 11 August 1994) is a Paraguayan professional footballer who plays as a winger for Liga MX club Santos Laguna and the Paraguay national team.

Club career

Sol de América
Born in Asunción, Domínguez was a Sol de América youth graduate. On 20 November 2011, aged 17, he made his first team – and Primera División – debut, coming on as a late substitute in a 2–1 home win against Guaraní.

On 18 December 2011, in only his second appearance, he scored his professional goal by netting a last-minute equalizer in a 2–2 home draw against Cerro Porteño. He then became a regular starter from the 2012 season onwards.

On 1 July 2014, Domínguez was loaned to Nacional for the remainder of the 2014 Copa Libertadores. On 15 August, after the club was knocked out, he returned to his parent club, having only made two appearances.

Cerro Porteño
On 20 December 2014, Domínguez moved to Cerro Porteño for a US$ 750,000 fee for 50% of his federative rights. Regularly used, he scored a career-best 19 goals during the 2016 campaign; highlights included braces against Deportivo Capiatá (3–2 and 2–1 home wins), River Plate (3–2 away win) and former side Nacional (6–1 away win).

He also had a great Copa Sudamericana campaign, where he scored six goals in seven matches, including a hat trick against Independiente Santa Fe, and finished tied for the golden boot with Miguel Borja.

América
On 14 January 2017, Mexican side Club América signed Domínguez on a four-year contract. He made his debut abroad fourteen days later, starting and scoring the only goal of the match in a Liga MX home win against Veracruz.

On 29 July 2017, Domínguez scored a brace in a 2–0 away win against Pachuca.

Independiente
On 24 January 2019, Domínguez joined Argentine club Independiente on a deal worth US$6 million, becoming the club's all-time record signing. His performance at the club was well below expectations for such an expensive pass.

Austin FC
On 24 August 2020, Domínguez was announced as the first Designated Player of the newly formed MLS franchise Austin FC, set to make its competitive debut in 2021. On 31 August 2020, it was announced that Domínguez would spend the remainder of the season on loan with Guaraní in the Paraguayan Primera División.

On 24 April 2021, Domínguez scored two goals for Austin FC against the Colorado Rapids in the club's first ever victory.

Domínguez started the 2022 season off strong with two goals in his first four games, but was sidelined when the MLS suspended him on April, starting an investigation into an off-field incident regarding domestic violence. On May 4, he was reinstated into the Austin FC squad and began training with the rest of the team. However, on 23 July 2022, Austin announced that the club and Domínguez had mutually agreed to terminate his contract.

International career
After playing for Paraguay at under-17 and under-20 levels, Domínguez was first called by the full side on 2 October 2014, for friendlies with South Korea and China. He made his full international debut eight days later, replacing Derlis González in a 2–0 loss against the former in Cheonan.

Career statistics

Club

International

Honours

Cerro Porteño
 Paraguayan Primera División: 2015 Apertura

América
 Liga MX: Apertura 2018

Individual
 Paraguayan Primera División Top Scorer: 2016 Clausura

References

External links

1993 births
Living people
Sportspeople from Asunción
Paraguayan footballers
Paraguayan expatriate footballers
Paraguay international footballers
Paraguay under-20 international footballers
Association football wingers
Association football forwards
Paraguayan Primera División players
Liga MX players
Argentine Primera División players
Club Sol de América footballers
Club Nacional footballers
Cerro Porteño players
Club América footballers
Club Atlético Independiente footballers
Austin FC players
Club Guaraní players
Paraguayan expatriates in Mexico
Expatriate footballers in Mexico
Expatriate footballers in Argentina
2019 Copa América players
Designated Players (MLS)
Major League Soccer players